Kalophrynus palmatissimus is a species of frog in the family Microhylidae.
It is endemic to Malaysia.
Its natural habitat is subtropical or tropical moist lowland forests.
It is threatened by habitat loss.

References

External links
Amphibian and Reptiles of Peninsular Malaysia - Kalophrynus palmatissimus

Kalophrynus
Taxonomy articles created by Polbot
Amphibians described in 1984